Uorga (Uorğa) is a rural locality (a selo), and one of two settlements in Khadarsky Rural Okrug of Churapchinsky District in the Sakha Republic, Russia, in addition to Yuryung-Kyuyol, the administrative center of the Rural Okrug. Its population as of the 2010 Census was 50; down from 83 recorded in the 2002 Census.

References

Notes

Sources
Official website of the Sakha Republic. Registry of the Administrative-Territorial Divisions of the Sakha Republic. Churapchinsky District. 

Rural localities in Churapchinsky District